Charlottesville Catholic School (CCS) is a private school under the jurisdiction of the Diocese of Richmond. It is a day school for pre-kindergarten through 8th grade. The school provides Spanish, Latin, theatre, clubs, sports teams, and more. The institution is currently 22 years old, having been founded in 1996.

The History
In mid-2007 the basement was converted into an expanded lunchroom, a music room was created, computer "lab", art room and extra storage space (storage courtesy of Eagle Scout of Troop 17) all were made. In 2016 the school built a STEM Lab and new music room as well. In 2015, 2016, and 2017, the school executed their "Read-a-Thon" that was led by the librarian, Michelle Banaszak; students would get to stay for the night at the school. Also in 2005 and 2014, the school won the annual blue ribbon award. In 2016 the school finished the STEM wing.

References

External links
 

Private K–8 schools in the United States
Private elementary schools in Virginia
Private middle schools in Virginia
Educational institutions established in 1996
Schools in Albemarle County, Virginia
1996 establishments in Virginia